Drosophila obscura  is a very abundant European species of fruit fly from the family Drosophilidae. It has been found in most habitat types with exception of coastal areas and open heathland. Larvae can be found in the sap runs of a number of deciduous trees.

References 

o
Muscomorph flies of Europe
Taxa named by Carl Fredrik Fallén
Insects described in 1823